Kora rupestris is a species of tropical air-breathing land snails, a pulmonate gastropod mollusc in the family Bulimulidae.

Distribution 
Kora rupestris occurs in Carinhanha, Serra do Ramalho and Coribe municipalities, in Bahia, Brazil.

Description

References

Bulimulidae
Gastropods described in 2016